The 1908 United States presidential election in Nevada was held on November 3, 1908 as part of the 1908 United States presidential election. Voters chose three representatives, or electors to the Electoral College, who voted for president and vice president. 

Nevada was won by Democratic nominee  William Jennings Bryan, who narrowly won the state with 45.71% of the vote, to the Republican Party nominee William Howard Taft’s 43.93%, winning him the state’s three electoral votes.

Socialist candidate Eugene Debs received his highest percentage nationally in Nevada with 8.57% of the vote. Bryan, who had also carried the state against William McKinley in both 1896 and 1900 saw a loss of 35.50% from his 1896 vote and of 16.54% from his 1900 vote.

This was the last presidential election where a Democrat carried Nevada without winning the presidency until 2016, and remains the last time that the state has supported a Democrat who lost the popular vote.

Campaign

The six Democratic Nevada delegates were selected at the state convention held in Carson City and consisted of Senator Francis G. Newlands, Governor Denver S. Dickerson, Winfield Scott Elliott, Ed W. Clark, John Sunderland, and Charles R. Evans with A. W. Dawley, Charles Green, Thomas Dunn, journalist A. P. Bettersworth, Fred L. White, and Captain G. W. Thatcher serving as alternative delegates with instruction to vote for Bryan. Recently elected Governor Dickerson lead the Nevada delegation at the Democratic national convention. Charles L. Sprague, L. L. Hudson, and Joseph A. Miller were selected as the three Democratic presidential electors.

The five Republican Nevada delegates were selected at the state convention held in Winnemucca and consisted of J. F. Douglas, P. L. Flanigan, Wm. Easton, Hugh Brown, and Geo Russell and were to be accompanied by Senator George S. Nixon and were left uninstructed as to whom to vote for, but stated that they favored Taft. M. D. Staunton, John G. Thompson, O. R. Morgan, O. J. Smith, and R. W. Parry were selected as alternative delegates. J. G. Thompson, H. A. Comins, and W. R. Thomas were selected as the Republican presidential electors.

The Socialist Party of America's presidential electors were J. B. Gibson, Charles T. Williams, and A. E. Anderson. The Independence Party's presidential electors were H. W. Miles, Dean Martin, and J. C. Hagerman.

In September Eugene V. Debs made a short stop in Caliente and addressed a crowd during a train stop.

On October 31 a political rally in favor of Taft was held in Reno where Senatorial candidate P. L. Flanigan, former Nevada Supreme Court Justice William A. Massey, and others spoke in favor of Taft, their candidacies, and of the Republican platform.

Results

Results by county

See also
United States presidential elections in Nevada

References

Nevada
1908
1908 Nevada elections